Stigmella titivillitia is a moth of the family Nepticulidae. It is only known from Hokkaido in Japan.

The larvae feed on Alnus japonica and Alnus hirsuta. They mine the leaves of their host plant.

External links
Japanese Species Of The Genus Stigmella (Nepticulidae: Lepidoptera)

Nepticulidae
Moths of Japan
Moths described in 1985